Yas is an Iranian rapper.

Yas or YAS may also refer to:

Organisations based in England
 Yorkshire Ambulance Service
 Yorkshire Archaeological Society

Other people in the arts 
 Y.A.S., a French electronic music duo formed in 2007
 Yoshikazu Yasuhiko (born 1947), Japanese animator and artist

Places in the United Arab Emirates
 Yas Island, an island in Abu Dhabi, 
 Yas Mall
 W Abu Dhabi - Yas Island, formerly Yas Hotel

Storms 
 Cyclone Yaas, a North Indian Ocean cyclone in May 2021
Cyclone Yasa, the fourth-most intense tropical cyclone in the South Pacific in December 2020
Cyclone Yasi, the costliest tropical cyclone in the Australian region in February 2011

Other uses 
 Yas (slang), affirmative variant in English
 Yas (yacht), a 2011 superyacht built in Abu Dhabi

See also
 Yaz (disambiguation)